Victor Anthony Koko (born 14 December 1992) is a Nigerian basketball player who plays for Rivers Hoopers and .

Professional career
Koko was born in Ika North East in the Nigerian Delta State. Since 2019, Koko plays for the Rivers Hoopers. With the team he won the 2019 NBBF President Cup and qualified for the 2021 BAL season. He started in two of the three games for the Hoopers, averaging 7 points and 8 rebounds.

In the 2021 Premier League season, Koko won his second title with the Hoopers. He was named the MVP of the final, after he recorded 14 points, 10 rebounds and 4 blocks in the won game against Gombe Bulls.

National team career
Koko was on the Nigeria national basketball team for FIBA AfroCan 2019 and AfroBasket 2021.

He has also played 3x3 basketball for the Nigerian basketball team, playing at the FIBA 3x3 Africa Cup 2019.

BAL career statistics

|-
| style="text-align:left;"|2021
| style="text-align:left;"|Rivers Hoopers
| 3 || 2 || 20.8 || .278 || .000 || .333 || 8.3 || 1.3 || .0 || 2.3 || 4.0
|-
|- class="sortbottom"
| style="text-align:center;" colspan="2"|Career
| 3 || 2 || 20.8 || .278 || .000 || .333 || 8.3 || 1.3 || .0 || 2.3 || 4.0

References

External links
Victor Koko at RealGM

1992 births
Living people
Centers (basketball)
Nigerian men's basketball players
Rivers Hoopers players